Captain Marvel is the name of several fictional superheroes appearing in American comic books published by Marvel Comics. Most of these versions exist in Marvel's main shared universe, known as the Marvel Universe.

In the Marvel Cinematic Universe, Captain Marvel is Carol Danvers, portrayed by McKenna Grace and Brie Larson in Captain Marvel and Avengers: Endgame (both 2019), Shang-Chi and the Legend of the Ten Rings (2021), and the Disney+ television series Ms. Marvel (2022). Brie Larson will reprise her role in the sequel The Marvels (2023).

Publication history 

Following a trial in which DC Comics sued Fawcett Comics for breach of copyright, claiming Fawcett's Captain Marvel was too similar to Superman, the latter stopped publishing Captain Marvel in 1953. In the late 1960s Marvel gained the trademark "Captain Marvel" with its first series.

In order to retain its trademark, Marvel has published a Captain Marvel title periodically every few years since, leading to a number of ongoing series, limited series, and one-shots featuring a range of characters using the Captain Marvel alias.

Mar-Vell 

The first Captain Marvel comic book printed by Marvel Comics was created by Roy Thomas and Gene Colan. This character is an alien military officer, Captain Mar-Vell of the Kree Imperial Militia, who is sent to observe the planet Earth as it is developing technology to travel into space. Mar-Vell eventually wearies of his superiors' malicious intent and allies himself with Earth, and the Kree Empire brands him a traitor.  From then on, Mar-Vell fights to protect Earth from all threats.

He was later revamped by Roy Thomas and Gil Kane. Having been exiled to the Negative Zone by the Supreme Intelligence, the only way Mar-Vell can temporarily escape is to exchange atoms with Rick Jones by means of special wristbands called Nega-Bands. He is also given superpowers, and his Kree military uniform is replaced with a form-fitting costume. The process of the young man being replaced in a flash by the older superhero was a nod to the original Fawcett Captain Marvel, which had young Billy Batson say the magic word "Shazam" to transform into the hero.

With the title's sales still flagging, Marvel allowed Jim Starlin to conceptually revamp the character, although his appearance was little changed. Mar-Vell is freed from the Negative Zone and becomes a cosmic champion, the "Protector of the Universe" appointed by the cosmic entity Eon. Together, Mar-Vell and Rick continue to battle against evil, most notably battling the Death-worshipping Thanos. Mar-Vell became a close ally of the Titans, and one of their number, Elysius, became his lover.

His career was cut short when he developed inoperable cancer, the result of earlier exposure to toxic nerve gas during a battle with Nitro. He died from this cancer on Titan in the presence of the Marvel Universe's superhero community, as chronicled in Marvel's first large-format graphic novel, The Death of Captain Marvel, published in 1982.

Monica Rambeau 

The second Captain Marvel was created by writer Roger Stern and artist John Romita Jr. She first appeared in The Amazing Spider-Man Annual #16 (1982).

The character is Monica Rambeau, a police lieutenant from New Orleans Louisiana, who possesses the power to transform herself into any form of energy. Her powers were briefly altered so that she cannot transform to energy, but instead can generate a personal force field. Sometime later, the Stranger returned her energy-transformation abilities. She is a member of the Avengers, and at one point she served as their leader. She eventually ceded the Captain Marvel name to the original Captain Marvel's son after which Rambeau took the name Photon, using that name for quite some time until Genis-Vell adopted the same name. Genis-Vell and Monica discussed this, and Monica decided on the name Pulsar.

Rambeau later joined H.A.T.E. (the Highest Anti-Terrorism Effort) in the new series titled Nextwave. In this series created by Warren Ellis and Stuart Immonen, H.A.T.E. (a subsidiary of the Beyond Corporation) forms a team to fight the Bizarre Weapons of Mass Destruction. Members include Monica Rambeau, a man known only as The Captain, Boom Boom, Aaron Stack, and Elsa Bloodstone. She returned to the Avengers using the codename Spectrum.

Genis-Vell 

The third Captain Marvel is Genis-Vell, who first appeared in Silver Surfer Annual #6 (1993) using the codename of "Legacy". The character is the genetically-engineered son of Mar-Vell and his lover Elysius, created from the late Mar-Vell's cell samples and artificially aged to physical, if not emotional, maturity. Genis, like his father, wears the Nega-Bands, possesses Cosmic Awareness, and is, for a time, bonded with Rick Jones. Although the pair do not get along at first, they eventually become good friends. Genis goes insane and threatens to destroy the universe.

After dying and resurrecting himself—with the secret aid of Baron Helmut Zemo—Genis-Vell joins the Thunderbolts under the name Photon. However, in accelerating his resurrection, Zemo links Genis to the ends of time, causing a degenerative effect on the universe. To prevent the inevitable destruction of all existence, Zemo scatters pieces of Genis-Vell's body through time and the Darkforce Dimension.

Phyla-Vell 

The fourth Captain Marvel is Phyla-Vell, Genis-Vell's younger sister.  She was created by Peter David and Paul Azaceta in Captain Marvel vol. 5 #16 (Jan. 2004). Her name is a taxonomical pun on the part of writer Peter David. Phyla is created when Genis, an only child, recreates the universe and, in doing so, creates various anomalies which result in his mother being restored to life and his sister coming into existence. She is last seen romancing Moondragon.

Phyla-Vell appears in the Annihilation event, fighting alongside Nova's United Front in an effort to stop the destructive armies of Annihilus. She becomes the new Quasar after the original one is killed by Annihilus.

Phyla has superhuman strength. She can fire energy blasts, fly, and act like an "energy sponge", absorbing any energy attacks directed at her and returning them as energy blasts. Phyla also has cosmic awareness and is a proficient fighter.

Phyla later became an avatar for Oblivion and renamed herself Martyr.  She died to save her comrades in the Guardians of the Galaxy.

Khn'nr 

The fifth Captain Marvel is Khn'nr, who first appeared in Civil War: The Return (March 2007). He is a Skrull sleeper agent who is bound with Mar-Vell's DNA to lock itself into Mar-Vell's form and given technological replicas of the Kree Nega-Bands. However, his mental conditioning was botched, causing Khn'nr's personality to be erased leaving the Mar-Vell persona dominant. Though part of the Secret Invasion, this Marvel decides to fight against the invading Skrulls. As of now, he is apparently dead.

Noh-Varr 

As part of the Dark Reign storyline Noh-Varr joined the new team the Dark Avengers using the alias Captain Marvel. He first appears in Marvel Boy #1 (Aug. 2000). He subsequently quit the team upon discovering they were all villains, at which point he was contacted by the Supreme Intelligence, given a copy of the original Captain Marvel's Nega Bands, and told he should take his place as the Kree's protector of Earth. This led to Noh-Varr taking the new code name Protector. Noh-Varr currently goes by the codename Marvel Boy, the name he uses when he joins the Young Avengers and works alongside the Inhuman Royal Family.

Carol Danvers 

In July 2012, Carol Danvers, the longtime super-heroine known as Ms. Marvel, assumed the mantle of Captain Marvel in an ongoing series written by Kelly Sue DeConnick with art by Dexter Soy. Danvers dons a jumpsuit and explores her own past. DeConnick said at WonderCon 2012 that her pitch for the series could be described as "Carol Danvers as Chuck Yeager". She said the series would contemplate what Captain Marvel's legend means to Danvers, how she will wield it, and how the rest of the Marvel Universe reacts.

Other versions

Ultimate Captain Marvel

The Ultimate Marvel miniseries Ultimate Secret introduces a renegade Kree who has been surgically altered to look human and sent to Earth by his people to observe its destruction by the entity Gah Lak Tus, but defects to help the humans. He wears a specially designed combat suit that is activated by his wristwatch. The Kree technology in the suit gives Mahr Vehl increased strength and allows him to fly, create energy shields, turn invisible, view different fields of the light spectrum, and fire energy blasts through the "totalkannon" located on his lower arm.

His real name is Pluskommander Geheneris Halason Mahr Vehl. As with the Marvel Universe character of Mar-Vell, he assumes the identity of Dr. Philip Lawson, a scientist working on the space program. He dated the Ultimate version of Carol Danvers. The name 'Captain Marvel' arises as a mispronunciation by General Nick Fury and Carol Danvers. Only the Falcon and Thor have bothered to learn how to pronounce his name correctly.

Ruins

In the two-issue Warren Ellis mini-series Ruins (1995), Captain Marvel is one of the many Kree prisoners, in a Kree reservation in Nevada. The reservation was placed deliberately on top of a former nuclear test site. As a result of this, the majority of the Kree are suffering from various forms of cancers and tumours including Mar-Vell who is the Kree's spokesperson. Mar-Vell gives an interview to Daily Bugle reporter Phil Sheldon regarding the failed Kree invasion of Earth. Mar-Vell recounts how his ship was made vulnerable to a nuclear strike when their cloaking and shielding was affected by cosmic radiation from a deceased Silver Surfer.

Fantastic Four: The End

In the limited series Fantastic Four: The End, the superheroine formerly known as Kismet (now under the name of Ayesha) has apparently taken over the Captain Marvel mantle in the not-too-distant future.

House of M

In the alternate, mutant-dominated world created by Scarlet Witch, Carol Danvers (Ms. Marvel in mainstream continuity) uses the name Captain Marvel and is one of the few non-mutant heroes with a successful career.

Marvel Zombies

In the mini-series Marvel Zombies, Captain Marvel is seen sitting with Vulture and Hercules (both infected) waiting for Iron Man.  He is later killed by the Silver Surfer for immediate cause.

Cancerverse
In The Thanos Imperative, the main villain is an alternate version of Captain Marvel called Lord Mar-Vell. Unlike his Earth-616 counterpart, this Mar-Vell colluded with the Many-angled ones to survive his cancer by actually destroying Death via the sacrifice of its Avatar.

Amalgam Comics

In two issues of JLX and JLX: Unleashed, Captain Marvel combines with Captain Marvel to become yet another Captain Marvel, sporting the DC Comics lightning bolt uniform design but with the original green and white colors of the Marvel version.

Age of Ultron

In the Age of Ultron crossover event, Janet van Dyne becomes Captain Marvel in an alternate timeline created by the death of Henry Pym. Pym is murdered by a time-travelling Wolverine to prevent the creation of Ultron, an artificial intelligence which in a post-apocalyptic future has wiped out most of the Earth's population including most superheroes.

In other media

Marvel Cinematic Universe 
 Captain Marvel was released in March 2019. It was centered on the Carol Danvers version of the character portrayed by Brie Larson. The film also featured Mar-Vell played by Annette Bening and Monica Rambeau played by Akira Akbar.
 Carol Danvers appeared in the films Avengers: Endgame (2019) and Shang-Chi and the Legend of the Ten Rings (2021) and the miniseries Ms. Marvel. 
 Teyonah Parris portrays the adult version of Monica Rambeau in the miniseries WandaVision (2021).
 A version of Captain Marvel appears in Doctor Strange in the Multiverse of Madness (2022), portrayed by Lashana Lynch. This version is Maria Rambeau, and is a member of the Illuminati.
 Both Brie Larson and Teyonah Parris will reprise their roles as Carol Danvers and Monica Rambeau respectively in The Marvels (2023).

Games 
Captain Marvel appears as a purchasable outfit in Fortnite Battle Royale.

References

Sources 

Captain Marvel (Phyla-Vell) at the Appendix to the Handbook of the Marvel Universe

External links 
 Captain Marvel at the Marvel Universe
 Captain Marvel at the Marvel Database Project
  Captain Marvel Appearances in Publication Order
 Captain Marvel Culture A history of the many Captain Marvels

 
1968 comics debuts
Characters created by Stan Lee
Comics about women
Marvel Comics adapted into films
Marvel Comics titles
Articles about multiple fictional characters